Sai Kung West Country Park (Wan Tsai Extension) is a  country park on the Sai Kung Peninsula in northeast Hong Kong. Opened in 1996 the park's sights include:

Wan Tsai
Ocean Point

References
Sai King West Wan Tsai Extension

Country parks and special areas of Hong Kong
Sai Kung Peninsula
1996 establishments in Hong Kong